Elżbieta Katolik (née Skowrońska; 9 October 1949 – 28 June 1983) was a Polish sprinter. She competed in the 4 × 400 metres relay at the 1972 Summer Olympics and the 1980 Summer Olympics.

References

External links
 
 

1949 births
1983 deaths
Athletes (track and field) at the 1972 Summer Olympics
Athletes (track and field) at the 1980 Summer Olympics
Polish female sprinters
Polish female middle-distance runners
Olympic athletes of Poland
Place of birth missing
Universiade bronze medalists for Poland
Universiade medalists in athletics (track and field)
Medalists at the 1973 Summer Universiade
Olympic female sprinters